Wade Edward Richey (born May 19, 1976) is a former American football placekicker in the National Football League.  He is widely regarded as having one of the strongest legs in high school, collegiate and NFL history.

Early life
Richey began his football career at Carencro High School in Carencro, Louisiana.

While at Carencro, he converted 24-of-34 field goals, including a 52-yard field goal in 1992 and a 53-yard field goal in 1993.  Richey also converted a career total of 46-of-49 extra points, while 90 percent of his kickoffs resulted in touchbacks.  37 of those kickoffs split the uprights.

At the end of his senior year, Richey was ranked as the number-one kicker in the nation and was named to the USA Today All-American football team.

At LSU

Over 30 universities offered Richey a full athletic scholarship, making him one of the most coveted kicking specialists in high school football history.  Richey eventually stayed in-state, choosing LSU over Stanford and Notre Dame.

Richey struggled at LSU, converting just 8-of-23 field goals.  He was primarily a kickoff specialist at LSU during his freshman and sophomore years but seized the starting role in 1996 as a junior.

During the 1996 season he set a LSU school record with a 54-yard field goal against Kentucky.

In the 1997 season, he was responsible for most of the placekicking duties, splitting time with back-up placekicker Danny Boyd.

Professional career

After his collegiate career, Richey went undrafted but signed with the Seattle Seahawks for the 1998 preseason.  Richey's impressive preseason performance with the Seahawks prompted the San Francisco 49ers to claim him off waivers, making him the starter for their season opener.

Richey played from 1998–2002 for the San Francisco 49ers and the San Diego Chargers. In the 2003 he played for the Baltimore Ravens as a kickoff specialist and converted a 56-yard field goal against the Cleveland Browns on Sept. 14, 2003.

Life After Football

Richey retired after the 2004 season.

He currently resides in Carencro, Louisiana, where he works for Hartwig, Inc. as a Sales Engineer.

1976 births
Living people
Sportspeople from Lafayette, Louisiana
American football placekickers
LSU Tigers football players
San Francisco 49ers players
San Diego Chargers players
Baltimore Ravens players